PB-28 Kech-IV is a constituency of the Provincial Assembly of Balochistan.

See also
 PB-27 Kech-III
 PB-29 Washuk

References

External links
 Election commission Pakistan's official website
 Awazoday.com check result
 Balochistan's Assembly official site

Constituencies of Balochistan